Church of St Mary the Virgin is a  Grade I listed church in Northill, Bedfordshire, England. It became a listed building on 31 October 1966.

The church's royal arms appears on a stained glass window designed by John Oliver. It is dated 1664, and therefore the arms is that of King Charles II. The window was commissioned by the Worshipful Company of Grocers, whose own arms appears next to the royal arms.

See also
Grade I listed buildings in Bedfordshire

References

Church of England church buildings in Bedfordshire
Grade I listed churches in Bedfordshire